The Sezon Museum of Modern Art is an art museum located in Karuizawa, Nagano Prefecture, Japan. The museum hosts exhibitions on contemporary art.

History 
The intention with creating this museum was to preserve the works of Yasujiro Tsutsumi. Founded in 1962 as the Tanakawa Museum, the facility was moved to Karuizawa City in 1981. In 1991, the name was changed to Sezon Museum of Modern Art. The museum also preserves and exhibits the collection of the Saison Museum, which was closed in 1999.

The museum building was designed to blend in with the natural surroundings of Karuizawa City. The sculptures in the garden were designed by Isamu Wakabayashi.

Collections 
The museum contains about 500 pieces of art. The museum has works by Japanese artists such as Isamu Noguchi, Shusaku Arakawa, Hisao Domoto. The museum also contains work by Western artists such as Anselm Kiefer, Mark Rothko and Marcel Duchamp. The museum houses exhibits of abstract art.

Gallery

References 

Karuizawa, Nagano
Museums in Nagano Prefecture
Art museums and galleries in Japan
Art museums established in 1981
1981 establishments in Japan
Modern art museums in Japan